Jef Billings was an American figure skating costume designer who directed Stars on Ice for more than a decade. His clients included many Olympic and World figure skating medalists. One of his most renowned creations is the free skating costume for Sarah Hughes, in which she won her 2002 Olympic gold medal at Salt Lake City.

Billings also worked for celebrities. He created a black dress for Kathy Bates in which she won the Academy Award for Best Actress in 1991. Country singer Tammy Wynette was costumed by him for a long time.

Billings won several Emmy Awards for his television work.

Awards and nominations

Primetime Emmy Awards

Daytime Emmy Awards

References

External links

American costume designers
1945 births
2016 deaths
Primetime Emmy Award winners
Daytime Emmy Award winners